CCR4-NOT transcription complex subunit 9 is a protein that in humans is encoded by the CNOT9 gene.

Function

This gene encodes a member of the highly conserved RCD1 protein family. The encoded protein is a transcriptional cofactor and a core protein of the CCR4-Not deadenylation complex. It may be involved in signal transduction as well as retinoic acid-regulated cell differentiation and development. Alternatively spliced transcript variants have been described for this gene. [provided by RefSeq, Oct 2012].

References

Further reading